Oleksandr Kapustin (born 28 October 1977) is a Ukrainian rower. He competed in the men's eight event at the 1996 Summer Olympics.

References

External links
 

1977 births
Living people
Ukrainian male rowers
Olympic rowers of Ukraine
Rowers at the 1996 Summer Olympics
People from Skadovsk
Sportspeople from Kherson Oblast